Point Frederick may refer to:

Point Frederick, New South Wales
Point Frederick (Kingston, Ontario), a peninsula in Kingston, Ontario